Paucartambo Province (from Quechua: Pawqar Tampu, meaning "colo(u)red tambo") is one of thirteen provinces in the Cusco Region in the southern highlands of Peru.

Boundaries
 North: Madre de Dios Region
 East: Quispicanchi Province
 South: Quispicanchi Province
 West: Calca Province

Geography 
Some of the highest mountains of the province are listed below:

Political division
The province is divided into six districts, each of which is headed by a mayor (alcalde). The districts, with their capitals in parenthesis, are:

 Caicay (Caicay)
 Challabamba (Challabamba)
 Colquepata (Colquepata)
 Huancarani (Huancarani)
 Kosñipata (Pillcopata)
 Paucartambo (Paucartambo)

Ethnic groups 

The people in the province are mainly indigenous citizens of Quechua ethnicity. According to the 2007 national census, Quechua is the first language of the great majority of the population (85.56%); 13.51% of the residents learned Spanish as their first language (2007 Peru Census).

See also 
 Chukchu
 Ch'unchu
 Ninamarka
 Qhapaq negro
 Qhapaq Qulla
 Saqra

Sources 

Provinces of the Cusco Region